Kosta Hakim (born 17 April 1917) is an Egyptian retired boxer who competed in the 1936 Summer Olympics. He was born in Alexandria.

In 1936 he was eliminated in the second round of the lightweight class after losing his fight to Carlos Lillo.

External links
profile

1917 births
Possibly living people
Lightweight boxers
Olympic boxers of Egypt
Boxers at the 1936 Summer Olympics
Egyptian male boxers